The parietal eminence (parietal tuber, parietal tuberosity) is a convex, smooth eminence on the external surface of the parietal bone of the skull. It is the site where intramembranous ossification of the parietal bone begins during embryological development. It tends to be slightly more prominent in women than in men, so may be used to help to identify the sex of a skull.

Additional images

References

External links

 

Bones of the head and neck